This is the discography of English singer Becky Hill. She released her first extended play, Losing, in November 2014. She released her second extended play, Eko, in August 2017. The EP includes the singles "Back to My Love", "Warm", "Rude Love" and "Unpredictable". She released her first compilation album, Get to Know, in September 2019. The album peaked at number twenty-four on the UK Albums Chart. The album includes the singles "Afterglow", "Gecko", "Piece of Me", "False Alarm", "Sunrise in the East", "Back & Forth", "I Could Get Used to This" and "Wish You Well". Hill released her debut album Only Honest on the Weekend on 27 August 2021.

Albums

Studio albums

Compilation albums

Extended plays

Singles

As lead artist

As featured artist

Promotional singles

Guest appearances

Songwriting credits

Notes

References

Discographies of British artists